The genus Neides is a small but common Old World group of stilt bugs; the name has precedence of the junior synonym name Berytus which Fabricius coined for the same taxon in 1803. It formerly included one North American species (Neides muticus), which has been removed to its own genus, Neoneides.

Species
Neides aduncus (Fieber, 1859)
Neides brevipennis Puton, 1895
Neides gomeranus Heiss, 1978
Neides tipularius (Linnaeus, 1758)

References 

Berytidae
Pentatomomorpha genera